Kenya–Sudan relations are bilateral relations between Kenya and Sudan. The two nations maintain ties in various areas, primarily in the security sector.

Overview
Kenya and other African Great Lakes nations were known supporters of the Sudan People's Liberation Movement freedom movement in what was then southern Sudan. The country hosted refugees and is suspected to have supplied armaments to South Sudanese rebels during the First Sudanese civil war. Aid to the SPLM negatively affected general relations between Sudan and nearby countries, including Kenya.

Kenya oversaw a ceasefire deal signed between South Sudan and Sudan. This eventually led to the independence of South Sudan and the end of the Second Sudanese civil war.

In 2010, Sudan's President Omar al-Bashir returned from a visit to Nairobi while the ICC had issued a warrant for his arrest. In November 2011, a Kenyan court issued its own arrest warrant to Al-Bashir if he were to enter Kenya again. This led to diplomatic tension between both countries.

Additionally, Sudan and Kenya have been part of the talks aimed at ending the civil war in South Sudan.

Diplomatic missions
 Sudan maintains an embassy in Nairobi.
 Kenya also has an embassy in Khartoum.

See also
Foreign relations of Kenya
Foreign relations of Sudan

References

 
Sudan
Bilateral relations of Sudan